Tamás Szekeres (born 18 September 1972, in Budapest) is a Hungarian former football player.

Honours
Nemzeti Bajnokság I (4): 1992, 1995, 1997,1999
Magyar Kupa (7): 1991, 1993, 1994, 1995, 1997, 1998, 2005
Szuperkupa (3): 1993, 1994, 1995
Norwegian Cup (1): 2006

External links 

Living people
1972 births
Hungarian footballers
Fredrikstad FK players
Tromsø IL players
Ferencvárosi TC footballers
MTK Budapest FC players
Strømsgodset Toppfotball players
FC Sopron players
Újpest FC players
FC Energie Cottbus players
Debreceni VSC players
K.A.A. Gent players
Eliteserien players
Belgian Pro League players
Hungarian expatriate footballers
Expatriate footballers in Belgium
Expatriate footballers in Germany
Expatriate footballers in Norway
Hungarian expatriate sportspeople in Belgium
Hungarian expatriate sportspeople in Germany
Hungarian expatriate sportspeople in Norway
Association football defenders
Hungary international footballers
Footballers from Budapest